Roger Warren Sandler (born February 23, 1934) is a retired major general in the United States Army. He is a former chief of the United States Army Reserve, a position he held from August 1, 1991 to January 31, 1994.

References

United States Army generals
1934 births
Living people
People from Brooklyn